Reinier Bertus Beeuwkes (17 February 1884 – 1 April 1963) was a Dutch footballer.

Club career
Beeuwkes was born in The Hague and played for local side Quick. At the beginning of the 20th century he moved to play as a goalkeeper for DFC.

International career
On 30 April 1905, Beeuwkes played for the Netherlands in its first international game, when it won 4:1 against Belgium in an away game at Antwerp.

Until 1910 he remained goalkeeper for the national team, contributing considerably to its development as one of the strongest European teams of the period. The high point of his career was playing for the Netherlands in the 1908 Summer Olympics, that included football for the first time. After Hungary and Bohemia withdrew their teams, the Netherlands reached the semi-final uncontested, when it lost 4:0 to the later winners, England. However, it received a bronze medal for its 2:0 win against Sweden. He was known for his punching of the ball instead of catching it and for playing in exactly the same kit as the outfield players.

Personal life
In 1910 he terminated his footballing career and emigrated to the Dutch East Indies, but he died in the city of his birth, The Hague.

Career statistics

International

References

External links

 Profile at VoetbalStats.nl

1884 births
1963 deaths
Footballers from The Hague
Association football goalkeepers
Dutch footballers
Netherlands international footballers
Olympic footballers of the Netherlands
Footballers at the 1908 Summer Olympics
Olympic bronze medalists for the Netherlands
Olympic medalists in football
Medalists at the 1908 Summer Olympics
FC Dordrecht players